Kis Din mera Viyah Howay Ga (meaning, "When will I get married?") is a Pakistani sitcom series first aired on Geo TV in August 2011. The series was first directed by Muhammad Iftikhar Iffi and starred Faisal Qureshi, Aijaz Aslam, Jana Malik, and Sangeeta. The plot revolves around the Chaudhary family who live in a mansion together in a small village near Lahore, Pakistan. Much of the humor centers around the character Sheeda who disguises himself as a girl named Sheedo to hide from his former gang members, and to protect himself from being arrested. Kis Din Mera Viyah Howay Ga went off the air 15 September 2011, and returned for a second season in late July 2012. The second season ended on 23 August 2012, after a decline in viewership, but it was renewed and the third season started on 11 July 2013.

It first aired on 2 August 2011, and had 4 seasons before ending on 3 November 2013. The OST was composed by Mohsin Javed. Each season consisted of 35–40 hour-long episodes, and aired at 8:00 pm from Monday to Thursday. Kis Din Mera Viyah Howay Ga aired every Ramadan and was among the top prime-time, weekday dramas in Pakistan.The show was aired on weekdays and aired for an hour, when first season ended the next year Second season came out with some new cast members and few new different crew members this season also aired on same basis, After another year third Season came out and this one also ran on same bases with some chained casting members. When the Fourth Season was reales instead of releasing after another year it was released after two months and aired once a week with just a few episodes.

Premise
The series is set in a village in Lahore, Pakistan. The main characters Chaudhary, Nazakat, Bilo, Sheeda, Nawab, and Shehzadi are family members living in a large house with their maid Pino. A gang of burglars convinces the teenager, Sheeda, to join their gang because he looks similar to their dead boss, Jabar Khan. After accepting a bribe, Sheeda has second thoughts when he learns the police are searching for Jabar Khan. In order to hide, he disguises himself as a girl named Sheedo. When Sheedo enters the Mansion, he unwittingly causes his best friend Nazakat fall for him.

Cast and characters

Guest appearance

Season 1
Sami Khan as Anwar
Noman Habib as Feekay
Seemi Pasha as Maasi Khaira
Hira Shaikh as Noori

Series overview

Season 1
Kis Din Mera Viyah Howay Ga season 1 was aired in Ramadan 2011 from 2 August and went off air on 15 September after 20 episodes. It was written by Samra Bukhari. It aired Monday to Thursday at 9:00 P.M. This season starred Aijaz Aslam, Faisal Qureshi, Jana Malik, Aiman Tariq, Sangeeta, Sadia Ghaffar, and Hashim Butt.

Season 2
After the success of season 1, it came back with season 2 which on aired in Ramadan 2012 from 19 July to 23 August. It was written by Kazim Zaidi. This season had some changes in cast of the play. It stars Qavi Khan as Mirza Sahab, Gul e Rana as Sahibaan, Faysal Qureshi as Sheda/Jabir Khan/Aunty Shades, Aijaz Aslam as Choudry Nazakat, Sumbul Iqbal as Naik Perveen, Sana Askari as Sawera, Arij Fatima as Mooni, Tipu Shah as Inspector Saleem, Yasira Rizvi as Laila, Ayesha Gul as Dolli, Shakeel Siddiki as DON 2. This season ends after 36 episodes and got better ratings.

Season 3
In 2013, it come back on 11 July and went off air on 14 August after 35 episodes. This season was written by Asad Bukhari. Lead cast was same but few new characters were also introduced like Sana Fakhar, Eshita Syed, Maheen Rizvi, Sara Omair, Nimra Khan, and Taifoor Khan. This season declined in viewership, therefore its end came soon after Season 4 was started.

Weekend special
According to pattern KDMVHG on air every Ramadan once in year but after end of Season 3 in August, from 15 September 2013 it started on air weekly on Sunday but didn't gain TRPs due to decline in viewership and off air on 3 November after 13 episodes. This season was directed by Danish Nawaz while Neelam Muneer, Naved Raza, Erfan  Motiwala and others were also added in the cast along with Aijaz and Faisal.

Season 4

After gap of 5 years, KDMVHG is back with season 04. This time it is about the sister of Sheedo, Maseedo portrayed by Fakhar-e-Alam. The other names of cast include: Ghana Ali, Yashma Gill, Naveed Raza, Shafaat Ali, Sofia Ahmed and others. It premiered from 17 May 2018.

11th Lux Style Awards
 '''''Best TV Play (Satellite)-Nominated

Indian adaption
An Indian adaption of sitcom with same titled premiered on Zee Magic on 25 November 2013.

References

External links
 

2011 Pakistani television series debuts
A&B Entertainment
Cross-dressing in television
Geo TV original programming
Pakistani comedy television series
Pakistani television sitcoms
Punjabi-language television shows
Urdu-language television shows